Joseph Zammit (29 December 1932 – 15 June 2019) was an Australian wrestler. He competed in the men's Greco-Roman heavyweight at the 1956 Summer Olympics.

References

External links
 

1932 births
2019 deaths
Australian male sport wrestlers
Olympic wrestlers of Australia
Wrestlers at the 1956 Summer Olympics
Place of birth missing